Happy Days is 2018 Nepalese Drama action romance film directed by Milan Chams. The film stars Dayahang Rai, Priyanka Karki in the lead roles. Presented by BP Khanal, Happy Days tells a story about a girl who falls in love with two people.

Plot 
A guy who is desperate to go in London to settle with his life after finally going to London he starts to fall in love with a girl.

Cast  
 Dayahang Rai 
 Priyanka Karki
 Sanjay Gupta
Bikki Joshi
 Diya Poon

References 

Films shot in Kathmandu
Nepalese action films